The 1939 Ohio Bobcats football team was an American football team that represented Ohio University as an independent during the 1939 college football season. In their 16th season under head coach Don Peden, the Bobcats compiled a 6–3 record and outscored opponents by a total of 116 to 82.

Schedule

References

Ohio
Ohio Bobcats football seasons
Ohio Bobcats football